Christian Spears is an American athletic director currently serving at Marshall University. He has been the athletic director at Marshall since February 2022.

Career
Spears began working as the associate director of athletics at Northern Illinois University in 2009 after spending the previous six years as the assistant athletic director at Southern Illinois University. In 2013, Spears was named acting athletic director at NIU after Jeff Compher left to become the athletic director at East Carolina University.

In 2014, Spears was hired as deputy AD at Eastern Michigan University. In 2017, he was named interim AD after Heather Lyke left to become the AD at the University of Pittsburgh. Shortly after becoming interim AD, Spears followed Lyke to Pitt as the deputy athletic director.

In February 2022, Spears was named athletic director at Marshall University replacing interim AD, Jeff O'Malley. As athletic director of Marshall, he oversaw the completion of the fundraising to build a new baseball stadium for the Thundering Herd baseball team.

References

External links
 Marshall Thundering Herd bio

Year of birth missing (living people)
Living people
California State University, Long Beach alumni
Eastern Michigan Eagles athletic directors
Marshall Thundering Herd athletic directors
Northern Illinois Huskies athletic directors
Ohio State University Moritz College of Law alumni
People from San Marino, California
University of Washington alumni